Valerian Osmanovich Kobakhia (15 May 1929, Lykhny – 28 June 1992, Lykhny) was an Abkhaz and Soviet statesman and party leader. As the head of parliament, he signed the Declaration on the sovereignty of Abkhazia.

References

1929 births
1992 deaths
People from Gudauta District
Abkhazian State University alumni
Seventh convocation members of the Supreme Soviet of the Soviet Union
Eighth convocation members of the Supreme Soviet of the Soviet Union
Ninth convocation members of the Supreme Soviet of the Soviet Union
Recipients of the Order of the Red Banner of Labour
Abkhazian politicians
Soviet politicians